Suresh Oberoi (born 17 December 1946) is an Indian actor and politician who appeared in Hindi films. He is a recipient of the 1987 National Film Award for Best Supporting Actor. He started his career in radio shows, modelling and later moving to Bollywood, making him a popular character actor in the 1980s and much of the 1990s. He is the father of actor Vivek Oberoi.

Early life
Oberoi was born to Anand Sarup Oberoi, a Khatri and Kartar Devi on 17 December 1946 in Quetta, then Baluchistan Province of pre-partitioned British India. Within a year due to partition, the family along with four brothers and sisters moved to India, and later relocated to Hyderabad state where his family established a chain of medical stores. Oberoi attended St. George's Grammar School in Hyderabad and was active in sports. He was a Tennis and swimming champion, later winning the President's Award as a Boy Scout. After his father's death when he was just out of high school, Oberoi, along with his brother, continued running his pharmacy chain. He is fluent in Pashto, Punjabi, Hindi, Urdu, English, Telugu and Tamil.

Career
In the early 1970s, due to his interest in acting and a good voice, he gained entry into radio shows and stage plays, prompting him to attend the Film and Television Institute of India in Pune.

Modelling and radio shows
In his early Mumbai years, his prior radio show experience and his well received voice kept him going and his contacts with advertising agencies led to him being picked up as a model for Charminar cigarettes and Lifebuoy soaps, making him one of the leading models by late 1970s.

Bollywood
In late 1977 he made his debut with Jeevan Mukt. He did lead roles in films like Ek Baar Phir in 1980, but the film was not commercially successful. Later he was part of the radio program Mukaddar Ka Sikandar. Then he accepted character roles in Kartavya, Ek Baar Kaho, Surraksha and Khanjar between 1979 and 80, which were commercially successful.

He gained recognition nationally for his supporting role as a Police Inspector Sharma in the 1980 film Phir Wahi Raat, starring Rajesh Khanna in the lead and directed by Danny Denzongpa, which was both critically acclaimed and commercially successful. It also laid the foundation for him being cast as a police inspector in many of his future films.

In 1981, then he got opportunity to do Laawaris, which fetched him a nomination for Filmfare Best Actor in Supporting Role. Some of his performances, as small supporting roles which made a huge impact,  came in films like Namak Halal, Kaamchor and Vidhata. After these small roles, he received offer to star in lead role in B. R. Chopra's Mazdoor, co-starring with Dilip Kumar. His best performance as character actor came in Awaaz, a 1984 film directed by Shakti Samanta and starring Rajesh Khanna in the lead, where he played Police Inspector Amit Gupta. He received nomination for Filmfare Award for Best Supporting Actor for his performance in Ghar Ek Mandir.

Since 1984, he regularly kept getting good character roles in films like Ek Nai Paheli, Kanoon Kya Karega, Sharabi, Aeitbaar, Bepanaah and Jawab. He received National Award for Best Supporting Actor for his performance in Mirch Masala in 1985. His performances in films like Palay Khan, Dacait, the Telugu film Marana Mrudangam, Tezaab, Do Qaidi, Parinda, Mujrim,  Aaj Ka Arjun, Pyar Ka Devta, Tiranga, Anari, Vijaypath, Masoom, Raja Hindustani, Soldier, Safari, Gadar Ek Prem Katha, Lajja, Pyar Tune Kya Kiya and 23 March 1931 Shaheed were appreciated by the audience.

Thereafter, till the early 2000s, he appeared on average in four to five films per year. He has made over 135 films. He recited a few couplets in the song "Dil Mein Phir Aaj Teri" with Anuradha Paudwal for the film Yaadon Ka Mausam (1990).

In 2004, He joined the Bharatiya Janata Party as a primary member.

Television
Oberoi has acted in the television shows Dhadkan and Kashmeer and hosted the second season of the talk show Jeena Isi Ka Naam Hai which was made popular by Farooque Shaikh.

Personal life
Suresh Oberoi married Yashodara, eight years his junior, in Madras on 1 August 1974. The couple's has a son, Bollywood actor Vivek Oberoi, born in 1976 and a daughter Meghna Oberoi born a few years later. His wife Yashodara is, as he says in a 2002 interview with Times of India, "from a Punjabi business family who had lived in the south." 

His brother Krishan Oberoi's son Akshay Oberoi is also a Bollywood actor.

In addition to acting and singing, he writes "romantic and philosophical poetry".

Together with the motivational speaker BK Sister Shivani Verma, Oberoi is a goodwill ambassador of the World Psychiatric Association.

He is also the member of Bharatiya Janta Party.

Filmography

Films

Dubbing roles

Live action films

Animated films

Awards and nominations

Champions of Change Award in 2019, for his work in culture. The award was conferred by Shri Pranab Mukherjee at Vigyan Bhavan New Delhi on 20 January 2020.

References

External links

1946 births
Living people
Indian male film actors
Indian male voice actors
Male actors from Hyderabad, India
People from Quetta
Male actors in Hindi cinema
Bengal Film Journalists' Association Award winners
Best Supporting Actor National Film Award winners
Punjabi people